Archeparchy of Aleppo may refer to:
 Syriac Catholic Archeparchy of Aleppo
 Armenian Catholic Archeparchy of Aleppo
 Maronite Catholic Archeparchy of Aleppo
 Melkite Greek Catholic Archeparchy of Aleppo